Te Ngahuru  (?–1823?) was a notable New Zealand Tūhoe leader and warrior. Of Māori descent, he identified with the Ngāi Tūhoe iwi. He was born at Te Purenga in Ruatoki, Bay of Plenty, New Zealand. He was raised in Ruatoki and Ruatāhuna and spent most of his life in Ruatoki. His descendants are called Ngāti Koura. Tamarau Waiari was a grandson of his.

References

1823 deaths
New Zealand military personnel
People from the Bay of Plenty Region
Ngāi Tūhoe people
Year of birth missing
People from Ruatoki